Patrick S. Jeffrey (born June 24, 1965) is a retired diver from the United States. As a college athlete on the Ohio State University swimming & diving team, swept the three diving events (one-meter, three-meter and platform) at the Big Ten championship his senior year and was named conference Diver of the Year. Jeffrey graduated a decorated diver from Ohio State in 1988. In his last season, he became the only diver to sweep the NCAA diving titles (1-meter, 3-meter, and platform); a record he holds to this day.

He twice competed for his native country at the Summer Olympics, in 1988 and 1996. During the 1996, he was already out and performed as an openly gay athlete. His best result was a ninth place in the Men's 10m Platform event in Atlanta, Georgia (1996). Jeffrey twice won a bronze medal in the same event at the Pan American Games, in 1991 and 1995.

From 1999 to 2014, he was the diving coach at Florida State University, and under his guidance they dominated the Atlantic Coast Conference in that sport.

In August 2014, he moved to Stanford University, where he is Head Diving Coach of the men's and women's collegiate teams. He also owns the Stanford Diving Club, which consists of teams of junior, senior, and masters divers who compete at the national and international level.

References

External links
Patrick Jeffrey FSU faculty page
Sports-reference Patrick Jeffrey pagehttp://www.gostanford.com/ViewArticle.dbml?SPSID=817013&SPID=130813&DB_LANG=C&DB_OEM_ID=30600&ATCLID=209519852&Q_SEASON=2015

1965 births
Living people
Divers at the 1988 Summer Olympics
Divers at the 1996 Summer Olympics
Olympic divers of the United States
Ohio State University alumni
American LGBT sportspeople
Place of birth missing (living people)
Gay sportsmen
LGBT divers
American male divers
American diving coaches
Pan American Games bronze medalists for the United States
Pan American Games medalists in diving
Divers at the 1995 Pan American Games
Divers at the 1991 Pan American Games
Medalists at the 1991 Pan American Games
Medalists at the 1995 Pan American Games
20th-century American people